Julien Musafia (1925 – November 14, 2015) was an American pianist and musicologist.

He was born in Bucharest, Romania, in 1925. After an adventurous escape from his native country, he moved to the United States in 1950, where he attended the University of California, Los Angeles (UCLA), attaining degrees in musicology and political science. He became professor of music at California State University, Long Beach, a position he held for over thirty years. There he founded the Consortium Musicum, which he directed between 1971 and 1993, and is a member of Phi Beta Kappa.

Honours and prizes include the following: Paul Ciuntu Prize awarded by the Royal Academy of Music, Bucharest, Romania; the George Enescu Medal (Romania, 1995); First Prize at the Coleman Chamber Music Society (U.S.A.); the Louis Pasteur Awards in 1981 and again in 1983; two awards given by the California State University at Long Beach, California.
Among works published are the definitive edition of Dmitri Shostakovich's 24 Preludes and Fugues (in collaboration with the composer) M.C.A., New York, N.Y. 1971; The Art of Fingering in Piano Playing, M.C.A., New York, N.Y., 1971; an essay on the pianist Vladimir Horowitz, published by Schirmer, New York, N.Y., 1993; an essay entitled "Sir Karl Popper and Music", London School of Economics, 1995. Musafia also published numerous articles in Southern California newspapers, most of which were analytic music critiques.

Julien Musafia has left an extensive recording legacy, including radio recordings in Boston, Cologne, Bucharest, Moscow. He has concertized in Moscow, Frankfurt (during the Shostakovich Festival), Salzburg, London, Bucharest, Budapest, Pforzheim, Stresa, Cremona, Edinburgh, New York, Milan, Washington, Boston, Los Angeles (as Artistic Director of the Shostakovich Festival) and in many other locations.

He lived in Long Beach, California, until his passing on November 14, 2015.

His first marriage was to Pianist Beverly Carmen (1928-) (Dec 31, 1954- 1961), they shared a love for Shostakovich during a time when UCLA was focused on Germanic music and composers.

References

 Profile , January 9, 1997.
 George Enescu Society Advisory board
 Shostakovich Festival 

American musicologists
California State University, Long Beach faculty
Romanian emigrants to the United States
University of California, Los Angeles alumni
Musicians from Bucharest
People from Long Beach, California
American pianists
1925 births
2015 deaths
American male pianists